From Babylon To Timbuk2 is the debut album by Wu-Tang Clan affiliate and Brooklyn rapper Timbo King. It was released on August 30, 2011, by Nature Sounds. The Album was inspired by the 1969 Black Hebrews history book From Babylon To Timbuktu written by Rudolph R. Windsor. Bronze Nazareth produced most of the album and was assisted by Vinny Idol, BP, Dev-1, Fizzy Womack, Akir, Vision N.D.N.S. and feature guest contributions by Akir, Beazy, R.A. the Rugged Man, Hell Razah, Killah Priest, William Cooper (of Black Market Militia), RZA, Junior Reid, Keesha, Mishawn and Vision N.D.N.S. He has released music videos on YouTube for the singles: "Bar Exam", "From Babylon to Timbuk2", "High Ranking", "The Autobiography of Timothy Drayton" and "Book Value".

Track list 
 The Book of Timothy
 Wardance (feat. RZA)
 Bar Exam
 From Babylon to Timbuk2 (feat. William Cooper (of Black Market Militia)
 The Two Babylonians (interlude)
 High Ranking (feat. R.A. the Rugged Man)
 Show Us The Way
 Outside Intelligence (feat. Killah Priest & Beazy)
 Identity Crisis (Interlude)
 Youth
 The Autobiography of Timothy Drayton
 The Rebellion (feat. Hell Razah & Junior Reid)
 Tombstone
 Book Value
 Brain Food (feat. Vision N.D.N.S, Akir, Keesha, and Mishawn)
 Timbuktu (interlude)
 Thinking Cap
 Ruling Class

References
 http://www.undergroundhiphop.com/timbo-king-from-babylon-to-timbuk2/IHI028CD/
 http://www.discogs.com/Timbo-King-From-Babylon-To-Timbuk2/master/379307

2011 albums
Nature Sounds albums
Albums produced by Bronze Nazareth